George Leredu (2 June 1860, Metz – 23 June 1943), lawyer, was mayor of Franconville-la-Garenne from 1908 to 1919, deputy (representative of parliament) from 1914 to 1927 then senator until 1936. He was Minister for Health after having been a Secretary of State of the Liberated Regions during a few months from February 19, 1920.

External links
  Georges Leredu

1860 births
1943 deaths
Lawyers from Metz
19th-century French lawyers
Mayors of places in Île-de-France
French Ministers of Health
Senators of Seine-et-Oise
20th-century French lawyers